The first season of the television comedy series Mike & Molly aired between September 20, 2010 and May 16, 2011, on CBS in the United States. The season was produced by Chuck Lorre Productions and Warner Bros. Television, with series creator Mark Roberts serving as executive producer along with Chuck Lorre, James Burrows and Don Foster.

The series focuses on the title characters Mike Biggs (Billy Gardell) and Molly Flynn (Melissa McCarthy), a couple who meet at an Overeaters Anonymous meeting in Chicago, Illinois. After Molly, a primary-school teacher, invites police officer Mike to give a talk to her class, they begin dating. Molly lives at home with her mother Joyce (Swoosie Kurtz), and sister Victoria (Katy Mixon). Joyce is in an on-off relationship with widower Vince Moranto (Louis Mustillo), who is often seen at the house. Mike lives alone in an apartment but is regularly kept company by his best friend and partner in the police force Carl McMillan (Reno Wilson). Other prominent characters in the series include Carl's grandmother Rosetta (Cleo King); Mike's mother Peggy (Rondi Reed) and cafe worker Samuel (Nyambi Nyambi). Season one of Mike & Molly consisted of 24 episodes and aired Mondays in the United States at 9.30 p.m. until April 11, 2011, with the final three episodes airing at 9.00 p.m. 

The season received mixed reviews from critics, some of whom believed the show was clichéd and re-trod the path of old sitcoms. Some critics questioned the subject matter, with one particularly controversial article from Marie Claire commenting on the idea of two overweight actors playing starring roles. Nevertheless, the series received average ratings of 11.14 million viewers, placing it as the number 35 most watched show of the television season. Melissa McCarthy won the Primetime Emmy Award for Outstanding Lead Actress in a Comedy Series at the 63rd Primetime Emmy Awards for her performance as Molly, and the series was also nominated for a People's Choice Award for Best New Comedy. Mike and Molly was renewed for a second season to premiere in the 2011–12 television season.

Cast

Main
 Billy Gardell as Mike Biggs (24 episodes)
 Melissa McCarthy as Molly Flynn (24 episodes)
 Reno Wilson as Carl McMillan (24 episodes)
 Katy Mixon as Victoria Flynn (24 episodes)
 Nyambi Nyambi as Samuel (24 episodes)
 Rondi Reed as Peggy Biggs (9 episodes)
 Cleo King as Rosetta McMillan 'Nana' (12 episodes)
 Louis Mustillo as Vince Moranto (12 episodes)
 Swoosie Kurtz as Joyce Flynn (24 episodes)

Recurring and guest appearances
 David Anthony Higgins as Harry
 Reginald VelJohnson as Brother Heywood
 Brendan Patrick Connor as George
 Lamont Thompson as Andre
 David Mazouz as Randy
 Rebecca Field as Jill
 Robert Gant as Kyle
 Keone Young as Abe
 William Sanderson as Dennis

Episodes

Ratings

References

External links
Episode recaps at CBS.com
List of Mike & Molly season 1 episodes at Internet Movie Database

2010 American television seasons
2011 American television seasons
Mike & Molly
Television episodes directed by James Burrows